Vriesea duvaliana is a plant species in the genus Vriesea. It is an epiphyte endemic to the State of Bahia in eastern Brazil, but cultivated in other regions as an ornamental. It (or its cultivar(s)) is a recipient of the Royal Horticultural Society's Award of Garden Merit.

Cultivars
 Vriesea 'Duvaliana Major'
 Vriesea 'Duvalii'
 Vriesea 'Elegans'
 Vriesea 'Fulgida'
 Vriesea 'Minima'
 Vriesea 'Obliqua'
 Vriesea 'Rostrum Aquilae'
 Vriesea 'Splendida'
 Vriesea 'Versaillensis'

References

duvaliana
Endemic flora of Brazil
Epiphytes
Plants described in 1884